Walter Laurer is an Austrian para-alpine skier.

He represented Austria at the 1976 Winter Paralympics and he won the bronze medal at the Alpine Combination I event.

He also competed in the Slalom I and Giant Slalom I events but did not win a medal; he finished 6th and 4th respectively.

See also 
 List of Paralympic medalists in alpine skiing

References 

Living people
Year of birth missing (living people)
Paralympic alpine skiers of Austria
Alpine skiers at the 1976 Winter Paralympics
Medalists at the 1976 Winter Paralympics
Paralympic bronze medalists for Austria
Place of birth missing (living people)
Paralympic medalists in alpine skiing
20th-century Austrian people